Alexander Kudryavtsev and Denys Molchanov were the defending champions but chose not to defend their title.

Purav Raja and Divij Sharan won the title after defeating Quino Muñoz and Akira Santillan 6–3, 4–6, [10–8] in the final.

Seeds

Draw

References
 Main Draw

Open Castilla y Leon - Doubles
2016
2016 Open Castilla y León